A headquarters unit is a specialised military unit formed around the headquarters of a  commanding officer and the requirements of that position. As such, a headquarters unit is always a component of a larger unit.

Examples include:
 headquarters regiment, which usually controls a brigade, division or larger unit;
 headquarters battalion  (controlling a regiment, brigade or larger unit);
 headquarters company (military unit) (controlling a battalion);
 headquarters platoon (controlling a company) 

Specific examples include:
 Headquarters and Headquarters Company (US Army)
 Headquarters and Service Company (US Marine Corps)

References

See also
 Corporate headquarters

Military organization
unit